Charles Gordon Lambert (9 April 1919 – 27 January 2005) was an Irish businessman, senator, and art collector who, in 1992, donated over 300 paintings to the Irish Museum of Modern Art. He had earlier campaigned for an Irish national modern art collection to be established and had been a prominent figure in the Irish art scene.

He spent almost all of his working life with the Irish biscuit makers, W. & R. Jacob & Co. Ltd., and is credited with the company's very successful marketing in the 1960s and 1970s, notably its long-running sponsorship of the Jacob's Awards.

He was the youngest of the four sons of Bob Lambert and his wife Nora (née Mitchell) of Rathgar. He was educated at Sandford Park School, Dublin, and Rossall School, Lancashire. Later, he studied commerce at Trinity College Dublin. He qualified as a chartered accountant, working with Stokes Brothers and Pim, before joining Jacobs in 1944.

In 1977, he was appointed to Seanad Éireann by the Taoiseach, Jack Lynch.

Lambert played field hockey for Three Rock Rovers, and won trophies in badminton and golf.

References

1919 births
2005 deaths
Irish art collectors
Irish Anglicans
Irish businesspeople
Members of the 14th Seanad
Independent members of Seanad Éireann
Nominated members of Seanad Éireann
Irish male field hockey players
Field hockey players from County Dublin
Three Rock Rovers Hockey Club players
20th-century Irish businesspeople